I Married a Communist is a Philip Roth novel concerning the rise and fall of Ira Ringold, known as "Iron Rinn."  The story is narrated by Nathan Zuckerman, and is one of a trio of Zuckerman novels Roth wrote in the 1990s depicting the postwar history of Newark, New Jersey and its residents.

Ira and his brother Murray serve as two immense influences on the school-age Zuckerman, and the story is told as a contemporary reminiscence between Murray and Nathan on Ira's life.  Although a communist, Ira became a star in radio theater.  Personal conflicts with  McCarthyite politicians, a gossip columnist, and his daughter-addled and manipulative wife all combine to destroy Ira and many of those around him.

Contents 
The novel tells the story of a great betrayal: Ira Ringold, laborer, upstanding communist and then media star, is socially annihilated by his wife Eve in the book, 'My Husband, the Communist'; in the paranoia of the 1950s 'McCarthy' era, almost nobody dares to show solidarity or support.

The rise and fall of the angry Ira Ringold (Latin: ira means anger) is told by his older brother, the teacher Murray Ringold, to his former student Nathan Zuckerman, who in turn tells the story to the readership as Philip Roth's alter ego.

Claire Bloom controversy

Some reviewers, especially those in the British press such as Rachelle Thackray of The Independent and Linda Grant of The Guardian, consider the character of Eve Frame — the antisemitic wife who destroys Ira — to be a barely disguised riposte to Roth's ex-wife, Claire Bloom, for her unflattering memoirs, which portrayed Roth as unable to bottle his vanity and incapable of living in the same household with Bloom's daughter, Anna Steiger.

Linda Grant writes of the similarities between Claire Bloom and Eve Frame:

Frame is a Jewish actress, so is Bloom. Frame's second husband is a financier, so was Bloom's. Eve Frame has a daughter who is a harpist, Bloom's girl is an opera singer. Ira tells the daughter to move out, Roth did the same. Ira has an affair with the daughter's best friend; Roth, Bloom alleged, came on to her own daughter's best friend.

She argues I Married a Communist "is not a novel", but rather, "an angry, bitter, resentful mess by a man who might have taken another course."

References

1998 American novels
Ambassador Book Award-winning works
Novels by Philip Roth
Novels set in Newark, New Jersey
Houghton Mifflin books